No Devotion are a Welsh-American rock  band formed in Pontypridd and Cardiff in 2014. The group is currently composed of American vocalist Geoff Rickly of the band Thursday, along with Stu Richardson and Lee Gaze, former members of the Welsh band Lostprophets.

The band's debut album Permanence, produced by Dave Fridmann, was released in 2015 and was supported by four singles: "Stay", "10,000 Summers", "Addition", and "Permanent Sunlight". Drummer Luke Johnson's departure was announced in early 2015, with former Bloc Party drummer Matt Tong recording the rest of the drums for the album.

While the band was mostly inactive beginning in 2016, a second album, No Oblivion, was announced in 2022 after being discussed for years. Before the album was released, rhythm guitarist Mike Lewis and keys/synth player Jamie Oliver left the band to pursue a career in cooking.

The band signed to Velocity Records in 2021. Prior to this, the band was signed to Rickly's Collect Records, which folded after it was revealed that convicted pharmaceutical executive Martin Shkreli was a major investor.

History

Formation and Johnson's departure (2014–15)
The band formed sometime in April 2014 only a few months after Lostprophets broke up. Stuart Richardson stated in 2019 that them going straight into a new band immediately was a deliberate choice so they could sever themselves from being associated with Ian Watkins due to his sentencing for numerous sexual offences including the attempted rape of a baby. After days of rumours, it was confirmed by ex-Thursday frontman Geoff Rickly in an interview on Radio Cardiff that he would be working with the remaining Lostprophets members on their new project through his own label, Collect Records, and described their new music as being influenced by Joy Division, New Order, and The Cure, although he did not confirm that he was going to be joining the band.

On 1 May 2014, it was announced that the former Lostprophets members would continue to make music with Rickly replacing the disgraced Watkins as their new vocalist, with Rickly saying that they "deserved a second chance." On 1 July, the band unveiled their début single "Stay", along with another song titled "Eyeshadow", as well as details of a short four-date tour taking place in Cardiff, Manchester, London, and Glasgow. Ahead of the first performances, the band confirmed that they would not continue playing music from the Lostprophets discography, referring to the songs as "tainted". The band's first live performances received positive reviews from critics and fans.

On 18 August 2014, No Devotion announced that they would be opening for Neon Trees on their First Things First tour. However, the tour was abruptly cancelled as a result of a significant heart surgery for Neon Trees bassist Branden Campbell.

On 6 October 2014, on the BBC Radio 1 Rock Show, Daniel P. Carter premiered the band's second single, "10,000 Summers", along with the b-side "Only Thing". Johnson left the band later that month, feeling that he would be unable to fulfil commitments to the band. The decision was made in 2014 but was not made public until January 2015, with former Bloc Party drummer Matt Tong completing the recording of their first album, and Phil Jenkins of Kids in Glass Houses joining as a live member.

In January 2015, they embarked on their second UK tour, taking place in Bristol, Birmingham, Southampton, Reading, and London, supporting Gerard Way on three of the dates.

On 30 June, the band announced they would be releasing their first album, titled Permanence, in September, and released two songs titled "Death Rattle" and "Addition".

Permanence (2015)

On 17 August 2015, their fourth single "Permanent Sunlight" was released. On 29 and 30 August they played at the Reading and Leeds Festival as part of their tour with Seether and Baroness, which included the live debut of the aforementioned song. On 27 August, the band announced further dates in Germany, the UK and US. Whilst in Germany, Rickly was drugged and robbed with that night's show then cancelled.

On 21 September, they released their debut album Permanence on SoundCloud, four days before its official release. Four days later on September 25, Permanence received its official release to positive reviews. The album went on to win the 2016 Kerrang Album of the Year award.

On 17 November 2015, they released a music video for their single "Permanent Sunlight".

Collect Records, which No Devotion was signed to, folded after it was revealed that since-convicted pharmaceutical executive Martin Shkreli was secretly a major investor behind the label. As a result, Permanence was removed from streaming services and the band's future remained uncertain.

Hiatus and No Oblivion (2016–present) 
In August 2017, Rickly's former band Thursday reunited. Thursday broke up for the second time in March 2019. Thursday reunited again in 2020.

While No Devotion was still inactive, band members announced a second album to be released by the end of 2019. In June 2019, Gaze confirmed that Oliver left the band in 2017 and Lewis would not perform on the band's second album. Richardson revealed in December 2019 that No Devotion had around eight songs completed for their second album, but plans for the album's release were still not yet finalised.

Both No Devotion and Thursday signed with Velocity Records in February 2021. Gaze confirmed Lewis' departure from the band via Twitter by changing his biography to reflect being one-third of the band.

On 6 June 2022, Permanence was re-released on streaming sites under Velocity Records. On 12 July, "Starlings", the first single from their newly announced second album No Oblivion, was released. On August 16, the band's second single "Repeaters" was released. On September 16, the band "No Oblivion" was released.

Styles and influences

Lead singer Geoff Rickly has described their music as reminiscent of bands such as The Cure, Joy Division and New Order.

Band members

Current members

 Geoff Rickly – lead vocals (2014–present)
 Lee Gaze – lead guitar, backing vocals (2014–present), rhythm guitar (2017–present)
 Stuart Richardson – bass, backing vocals (2014–present), keyboards, programming (2017–present)

Former members
 Luke Johnson – drums, percussion (2014–2015)
 Jamie Oliver – keyboards, programming, vocals (2014–2017)
 Mike Lewis – rhythm guitar, backing vocals (2014–2017)

Touring members
 Philip Jenkins – drums, percussion (2015–2017)
 Andrew King - drums, percussion (2022–present)

Session musicians
 Matt Tong – drums, percussion (2014–2015)

Timeline

Discography

Studio albums

Singles

Music videos

Awards

Kerrang! awards 

|-
| style="text-align:center;"| 2016 || Permanence|| Best Album || 
|}

References

External links

 

2014 establishments in Wales
Musical groups established in 2014
Pontypridd
Rock music supergroups
Welsh alternative rock groups
Musical groups from Cardiff
Equal Vision Records artists
Welsh post-punk music groups
Welsh indie rock groups
British electronic rock musical groups